For the Italian high jumper with the same name see Roberto Ferrari (athlete)

Roberto Ferrari (8 December 1890 – 15 August 1937) was an Italian gymnast who competed in the 1920 Summer Olympics. He was born in Genoa. He was part of the Italian team, which was able to win the gold medal in the gymnastics men's team, European system event in 1920.

References

External links
 

1890 births
1937 deaths
Sportspeople from Genoa
Italian male artistic gymnasts
Gymnasts at the 1920 Summer Olympics
Olympic gymnasts of Italy
Olympic gold medalists for Italy
Olympic medalists in gymnastics
Medalists at the 1920 Summer Olympics
20th-century Italian people